Sphodromantis royi, common name Roy's mantis, is a species of praying mantis found in West Africa (Burkina Faso, Mali, Mauritania, Niger, and Senegal).

See also
African mantis
List of mantis genera and species

References

royi
Mantodea of Africa
Insects described in 1967